The 2003 UEFA–CAF Meridian Cup was the fourth UEFA–CAF Meridian Cup and was held in Egypt.

Teams

  (host nation)

Standings

Results

UEFA–CAF Meridian Cup
Mer
2002–03 in Egyptian football
Meridan
International association football competitions hosted by Egypt